The Billboard Best Bets for Christmas survey ran each holiday season between 1963 until 1973 for a total of 46 weeks.  Billboard charted Christmas albums and singles exclusively in this section instead of its other charts.

Billboard number one Best Bets For Christmas
These are Billboard'''s Best Bets for Christmas number-one albums and singles.

Top 10 Christmas Albums
These are the LPs that reached the top 10 on Billboard's'' Christmas Record charts from 1958 until 1973.

See also
Billbaord Christmas Hits 1983-1989
Billboard Christmas Holiday Charts

References

Christmas